Kosmos 496 ( meaning Cosmos 496) was an unmanned test of the redesigned Soyuz ferry. The redesign may have involved changes to the Salyut/Soyuz hatch. It did not dock with any space station. After the Soyuz 11 disaster the third seat was removed because the space was need for the two crewmen in space suits and their equipment. Kosmos 496 retained its solar arrays.

Mission parameters
Spacecraft: Soyuz-7K-T
Mass: 6800 kg
Crew: None
Launched: June 26, 1972.
Launch site: Baikonur.
Orbit 195 x 343km.
Inclination 51 degrees.
Landed: July 2, 1972

References

Mir Hardware Heritage
Mir Hardware Heritage - NASA report (PDF format)
Mir Hardware Heritage (wikisource)

1972 in spaceflight
Kosmos 0496
Kosmos 0496
1972 in the Soviet Union
Spacecraft launched in 1972